The 1969–70 season was the 90th season of competitive football in England.

FA Cup

Chelsea won the cup by beating Leeds United 2–1 in a replay at Old Trafford after a 2–2 draw at Wembley Stadium. In the replay Leeds took the lead through Mick Jones before an equaliser from Peter Osgood forced the replay to extra-time. David Webb then scored the winner in the 104th minute to give Chelsea a first ever FA Cup triumph.

Manchester United beat Watford 2–0 at Highbury in the first ever third-place playoff, held the day before the final.

A number of non-league clubs made it to the Third Round i.e. Brentwood, Hillingdon Borough and South Shields as well as Sutton United who reached the Fourth Round before losing 6–0 to Leeds United.

George Best scored six goals for Manchester United in their 8–2 victory over Northampton Town in the Fifth Round. He received a match ball signed by all of the opposition players as a souvenir, and later donated it to the club's museum.

League Cup

Manchester City won the League Cup by beating West Bromwich Albion 2–1 after extra time. Second Division Carlisle United enjoyed a run to the semifinals of the competition but lost to Albion. In the other semi Manchester City beat local rivals Manchester United.

Star players
The FWA Footballer of the Year was awarded to Billy Bremner who was the outstanding player of the season despite the failure of Leeds to win any trophies. Jeff Astle of West Bromwich Albion finished the season as Division One top scorer by netting 25 goals. Albert Kinsey of Wrexham was overall league top-scorer, hitting 27 goals for the Fourth Division outfit.

Star managers
 Legendary Everton manager Harry Catterick continued his run of success at the club with a league title.
 Dave Sexton led his Chelsea to an historic first ever win in the FA Cup.
 Joe Mercer continued his run of success with Manchester City by capturing the League Cup and the Cup Winners' Cup.
 Bertie Mee led his Arsenal side to a first ever European triumph and set the club up for their Double win the following season.

National team
England took part in the 1970 FIFA World Cup, qualifying from their group after beating Romania and Czechoslovakia but losing to Brazil. The team then went out in the quarterfinals after losing 3–2 (after extra time) to West Germany. Preparations had been damaged after star defender Bobby Moore was arrested in Bogotá over later disproven allegations of theft.

Honours

Notes = Number in parentheses is the times that club has won that honour. * indicates new record for competition

Football League

First Division
Everton, one of the English game's dominant forces during the 1960s, had a strong start to the 1970s as league champions by a nine-point margin ahead of runners-up Leeds United, who had gone into the final stages of the season in contention for three major trophies but had failed to win any of them. They were beaten in an FA Cup final replay by Chelsea, who lifted the trophy for the first time in a season where they finished third. Derby County's return to the First Division after many years away saw them finish an impressive fourth under the management of Brian Clough. Liverpool completed the top five, while Coventry City recorded their best finish yet by finishing sixth under the management of former Manchester United captain Noel Cantwell.

Manchester United finished eighth under their new manager Wilf McGuinness, who had succeeded the retiring Sir Matt Busby in the close season. 

Manchester City managed only a mid table finish but lifted the League Cup and the European Cup Winners' Cup.

Sheffield Wednesday and Sunderland finished the season relegated.

Second Division
Huddersfield Town clinched the Second Division title by a comfortable margin to secure their return to the First Division, and were joined by Blackpool as runners-up. Leicester City just missed out on an immediate return to the First Division, while Middlesbrough's recent upturn in fortunes meant that they came just three points short of ending their lengthy absence from the top flight. Swindon Town, the previous season's surprise winners of the League Cup, recorded their best finish yet by finishing fifth in the Second Division.

Aston Villa and Preston North End, two clubs with illustrious histories and a host of major trophies between them, went down to the Third Division for the first time. Watford, a side with a much more modest history, won their battle against relegation but most impressively reached the semi-finals of the FA Cup.

Third Division
Orient and Luton Town advanced from the Third Division as champions and runners-up respectively. 

Stockport County, Barrow, Southport and Bournemouth & Boscombe Athletic went down to the Fourth Division.

Fourth Division
Chesterfield climbed out of the Fourth Division as champions, proceeding along with Wrexham, Swansea City and Port Vale.

Bradford Park Avenue were voted out of the Football League and replaced by Cambridge United. In February, Swansea Town were renamed Swansea City after Swansea received city status.

Top goalscorers

First Division
Jeff Astle (West Bromwich Albion) – 25 goals

Second Division
John Hickton (Middlesbrough) – 24 goals

Third Division
George Jones (Bury) – 26 goals

Fourth Division
Albert Kinsey (Wrexham) – 27 goals

European football
Arsenal won the Inter Cities Fairs Cup final, beating R.S.C. Anderlecht 4–3 on aggregate.  Manchester City won the UEFA Cup Winners' Cup final, defeating Górnik Zabrze of Poland 2–1 at the Prater Stadium in Vienna to complete a double triumph.  Leeds United reached the semi-final of the European Cup, but lost 3–1 on aggregate to Scottish champions Celtic.

References